The 1981 CECAFA Cup was the 9th edition of the tournament. It was held in Tanzania, and was won by Kenya. The matches were played between November 14–28. 

Somalia withdrew before the tournament.

Group A

Group B

Semi-finals

Third place match

Final

References
Rsssf archives

CECAFA Cup
CECAFA
1981
Foo